Sergey I. Bozhevolnyi (Russian: Сергей Иосифович Божевольный, born June 19, 1955) is a Russian-Danish physicist. He is currently a professor and the leader for the Centre for Nano Optics at the University of Southern Denmark.

Education and career
Bozhevolnyi was raised in the village of Kopanskaya, Yeysky District, Krasnodar Krai, USSR and grew up in a family of teachers of physics and mathematics. In 1978 he graduated from Moscow Institute of Physics and Technology with a Master of Science degree in physics. In 1981, he earned a PhD-degree from the same university with the thesis entitled "Study of electro-optical modulators and deflectors based on diffuse waveguides in LiNbO₃". In 1998, he earned a Doctor of Science Degree at Aarhus University, Denmark, with his thesis entitled "Subwavelength apertureless light confinement".

 1981—1989 Lecturer, Senior Lecturer, Associate Professor of the Yaroslavl Polytechnic Institute, Russia
 1990—1991 Head of Section of Optical Technologies, Institute of Microelectronics, Russian Academy of Sciences, Yaroslavl, Russia
 1987,1991 — visiting scientist, since 1992 lecturer and associate professor, since 2003 full professor at the Department of Physics and Nanotechnology, Aalborg University, Denmark
 1998—2001 Lecturer at the Center for Microelectronics, Technical University of Denmark, Denmark
 2001—2004 Chief Technical Officer, Micro Managed Photons A / S, Denmark
 since 2008 Professor of nano-optics, since 2013 head of the Center for Nano Optics at the University of Southern Denmark, Odense, Denmark

In 2006, together with professor Alexander Tishchenko at Jean Monnet University, he founded the Laboratory of Nano-Optics and Plasmonics in Moscow Institute of Physics and Technology

In 2017-2021, Bozhevolnyi was in the list of the most Highly Cited Researchers in Physics ( Clarivate / Thomson-Reuters).

Publications
Professor Bozhevolnyi has authored and co-authored more than 550 peer-reviewed articles with 12 patents and 14 book chapters. His h-index was 77 (Web of Science) and 91 (Google Scholar) as of September 15, 2022.

Awards
 2007 Elected Fellow of the Optical Society of America for his "pioneering contributions to near-field optics and plasmonics, including nonlinear phenomena and surface plasmon localization and guiding in nanostructures."

 2009 Best Scientist of the year from the Danish newspaper "Fyens Stiftstidendes Forskerpris"
 2011 Selected as a member of the Danish Academy of Natural Sciences (DNA)
 2019 Willum Kann-Rasmussen Prize (for outstanding contributions to the development of technical and natural sciences)
 2019 Danish Optical Society Senior Award (for outstanding contribution to near-field optics and fundamental efforts in the development of nano-optics in Denmark, 2019)
 2019 Selected as a member of the Danish Academy of Technical Sciences (ATV)
2020 Recipient of the EPS-QEOD Prize for "Research in Laser Science and Applications" (for seminal contributions to surface-plasmon polaritons and the developments of plasmonic metasurfaces)

References

External links

Metamaterials scientists
1955 births
Living people
Danish physicists
Russian physicists
Optical physicists
Fellows of Optica (society)
Moscow Institute of Physics and Technology alumni
Academic staff of the University of Southern Denmark
Russian emigrants to Denmark